Natalia Markova (born 11 January 1989) is a Russian professional wrestler. She is currently signed to the National Wrestling Alliance (NWA) and also wrestles on the independent circuit.

Markova began her career in 2007 with the Russian promotion Independent Wrestling Federation (NFR), where she performed until 2017. She also toured Japan where she worked for DDT Pro-Wrestling and Wrestling New Classic from 2011 to 2013. She resumed her career in 2016 after a two-year hiatus. She debuted in North America in 2017.

Professional wrestling career

Early Career (2007–2017)
Markova graduated from Independent Wrestling Federation (NFR) wrestling school in 2006 in Moscow and made her debut on 13 January 2007 at Danger Zone #23 as Bonnie in a match against Lilith, which ended in a disqualification after Gothic interfered on Lilith's behalf. On 24 June, at the Danger Zone show No. 28 in Luzhniki, Markova defeated Lilith, and thus became the champion of the NFR for the first time. On 30 September, she won the “Women's Battle Royale” and became a two-time champion. During her NFR career, Markova toured Japan, where she worked for DDT Pro-Wrestling and Wrestling New Classic from 2011 to 2013. She also worked in Europe, Asia and the Middle East.

Her last match with Independent Wrestling Federation was on January 21, 2017 when she her lost title to Ramona.

WWE (2017)
On October 13, 2017, it was reported that Markova was offered a tryout at the WWE Performance Center. She never wrestled a match.

Shine Wrestling (2017–2021)
Markova made her Shine Wrestling debut on July 14, 2017 at SHINE 43, where she competed against Maria Maria, Brandi Lauren, Daisy, and Dementia D'Rose. She returned at SHINE 44 where she had a match against Shotzi Blackheart and Dementia D'Rose. On June 29, 2019 at Shine 59, she won her first title by defeating Avery Taylor to become ACW Women's Champion. At Shine 60, Markova competed for her first Shine title, unsuccessfully challenging Blackheart for the Shine Nova Championship. At Shine 64, she won the Shine Nova Championship by defeating Jenna, Avery Taylor, Double D Rose and Lindsey Snow. 

Markova successfully defended title twice during Shine's live show on January 18, 2020, as well as at Shine 65 against contenders Jenna and Brandi Lauren. On September 19, 2021 at Shine 68, Markova lost the Nova Championship in a street fight against The Woad. On November 14, Markova won the Shine Championship at WWN Supershow: Battle Of The Belts from Ivelisse. On December 12 at Shine 70, Ivelisse won the Shine Championship from Markova in a rematch.

Evolve (2019–2020)
Markova made her Evolve debut on May 11, 2019 at Evolve 128, losing to Shotzi Blackheart. She won her first singles match on December 6 at Evolve 141, defeating Camron Bra'Nae. Markova's last match took place on March 1, 2020 at Evolve 146, in which she teamed up with Avery Taylor to defeat Brandi Lauren and Jessi Kamea.

All Elite Wrestling (2021)
Markova made her All Elite Wrestling debut on the May 17 episode of AEW Dark: Elevation in a match against Leyla Hirsch, which Markova lost. The following month, Markova competed in her second match on the June 8 episode of AEW Dark, losing to Tay Conti. She had her third and final match on the July 6 episode of AEW Dark, losing to Abaddon.

National Wrestling Alliance (2021–present)
After appearing in two matches during the NWA USA tapings on December 3, 2021, Markova made her official debut for the National Wrestling Alliance (NWA). Markova appeared on the NWA Hard Times 2 pre-show teaming with Missa Kate against Jennacide and Paola Blaze, Kylie Rae and Tootie Lynn, and the defending NWA World Women's Tag Team Champions The Hex (Allysin Kay and Marti Belle).

On August 28, 2022, at the second night of NWA 74, Markova became the inaugural Queen Bee. On November 12, at the NWA Hard Times In New Orleans, Markova had lost to Max the Impaler in a casket match.

Personal life 
Natalia Markova was married to fellow professional wrestler Ivan Markov.

In the summer of 2022, Markova was featured in media reports. Along with professional wrestler Bryan Idol, they were able to locate and apprehend the person who stole her purse on a flight to Tampa. They were able to locate the criminal by using the geolocation feature to find the AirPods she had in her purse.

Championships and accomplishments
 American Combat Wrestling
 ACW Women's Championship (1 time)
 CLASH
 CLASH Women's Championship (1 time, current)
 House of Glory
 HOG Women's Championship (1 time, current)
 Independent Wrestling Federation
 IWF Women's Championship (6 times)
 National Wrestling Alliance
 Queen Bee (2022)
 Pro Wrestling Illustrated
 Ranked No. 135 of the top 150 female wrestlers in the PWI Women's 150 in 2022
 Shine Wrestling
 Shine Championship (1 time)
 Shine Nova Championship (1 time)

References

External links 
 
 

1989 births
21st-century professional wrestlers
Expatriate professional wrestlers in Japan
Living people
Russian expatriate sportspeople in the United States
Russian female professional wrestlers
Sportspeople from Moscow